Michael Walter (12 March 1959 in Pirna – 6 August 2016) was a German luger who competed during the 1980s. He won two medals in the men's singles event at the FIL World Luge Championships with a gold in 1985 and a silver in 1981.

Walter also won two medals at the FIL European Luge Championships with a silver in the mixed team event (1988) and a bronze in the men's singles event (1986). He also won the men's singles Luge World Cup overall title in 1983-4.

Walter also competed in two Winter Olympics and was a substitute for the East German team on a third. His best finish at the Winter Olympics was fourth in the men's singles event at Sarajevo in 1984.

References

Hickok sports information on World champions in luge and skeleton.
List of European luge champions 
List of men's singles luge World Cup champions since 1978.

External links

1959 births
2016 deaths
German male lugers
Lugers at the 1984 Winter Olympics
Lugers at the 1988 Winter Olympics
Olympic lugers of East Germany
People from Pirna
Sportspeople from Saxony